In Greek mythology, the name Ereuthalion (Ancient Greek: Ἐρευθαλίων) may refer to:

Ereuthalion, son of Criasus, founder and eponym of the city Ereuthalia.
Ereuthalion, an Arcadian who fought in the battle against the Pylians "beneath the walls of Pheia about the streams of Iardanus". For the battle, he wore the armor of Areithous, which had been handed over to him by Lycurgus of Arcadia. He was killed by Nestor, who would later recall this as a notable episode of his youth and early battle experience, speaking of Ereuthalion as the strongest opponent he ever slew.
Ereuthalion, a Cilician, husband of Phyllis and father of Oeneus; his son fought under Dionysus in the latter's conflict with Poseidon. His wife and son are not to be confused with the better known characters of the names Phyllis and Oeneus.

Notes

References 

 Homer, The Iliad with an English Translation by A.T. Murray, Ph.D. in two volumes. Cambridge, MA., Harvard University Press; London, William Heinemann, Ltd. 1924. . Online version at the Perseus Digital Library.
 Homer, Homeri Opera in five volumes. Oxford, Oxford University Press. 1920. . Greek text available at the Perseus Digital Library.
 Nonnus of Panopolis, Dionysiaca translated by William Henry Denham Rouse (1863-1950), from the Loeb Classical Library, Cambridge, MA, Harvard University Press, 1940.  Online version at the Topos Text Project.
 Nonnus of Panopolis, Dionysiaca. 3 Vols. W.H.D. Rouse. Cambridge, MA., Harvard University Press; London, William Heinemann, Ltd. 1940-1942. Greek text available at the Perseus Digital Library.

Characters in Greek mythology
Arcadian mythology